Eyes of the Navy is a 1940 American short documentary film. It was nominated for an Academy Award at the 13th Academy Awards for Best Short Subject (Two-Reel).

Cast
 Charles Middleton as Farmer (uncredited)
 Russell Wade as Young Man in Automobile (uncredited)
 Frank Whitbeck as Narrator (voice, uncredited)

References

External links
 

1940 films
1940 documentary films
Black-and-white documentary films
1940 short films
1940s short documentary films
American short documentary films
American World War II propaganda shorts
American black-and-white films
Documentary films about military aviation
1940s English-language films
1940s American films